Algeria competed in the Winter Olympic Games for the first time at the 1992 Winter Olympics in Albertville, France.

They failed to win any medals.

Competitors
The following is the list of number of competitors in the Games.

Alpine skiing

Men

Women

References

Official Olympic Reports

Nations at the 1992 Winter Olympics
1992
Olympics, Winter